.sg is the Internet country code top-level domain (ccTLD) for Singapore. It was first registered in September 1988. It is administered by the Singapore Network Information Centre. Registrations are processed via accredited registrars.

In 2011, two new internationalized country code top-level domains were registered for Singapore, intended for domain names in the local languages.

Restrictions 
SGNIC requires that all .sg domains registered after 2 May 2013 have proof of Singaporean presence. This is facilitated by requiring the registrant to login to the Verified@SG portal with their SingPass account.

Second-level domains
 .com.sg – Commercial entities
 .net.sg – Network providers and info-com operators
 .org.sg – Organizations in the Registry of Societies
 .gov.sg – Government entities
 .edu.sg – Educational institutions
 .per.sg – Personal domain names
 .sg – Open to all with a valid Singapore postal address
 .新加坡 – for Chinese websites
 .சிங்கப்பூர் – for Tamil websites

.sg domain statistics
As of September 2022, there were 198,564 registered .sg domains.

References

External links
 IANA .sg whois information
 Singapore Network Information Centre (SGNIC)

Country code top-level domains
Domain names of Singapore
Computer-related introductions in 1988
Internet in Singapore

sv:Toppdomän#S